Cuthbertson Snowfield is a snowfield rising to  and covering the high ground of eastern Laurie Island (eastward of Watson Peninsula), in the South Orkney Islands. It was named by the UK Antarctic Place-Names Committee in 1987 after William Cuthbertson, the artist on the Scottish National Antarctic Expedition, led by W.S. Bruce, which wintered on Laurie Island in 1903.

References
 

Snow fields of Antarctica
Bodies of ice of the South Orkney Islands